Mycetia is a genus of flowering plants in the family Rubiaceae.

External links
Mycetia in the World Checklist of Rubiaceae

Rubiaceae genera
Argostemmateae